The Knickerbocker Stakes is an American Grade III race on turf for Thoroughbred horses run each year at Belmont Park in Elmont, New York. The Knickerbocker is open to three-year-olds and up, and set at a distance of  miles (nine furlongs). Run in mid October, it currently offers a purse of $200,000.

Graded status
 Grade 2: 1998–2004, 2017–present
 Grade 3: 1973–1997, 2005–2016

Historical notes
The Knickerbocker is named for a fictional character, Diedrich Knickerbocker, from Washington Irving's Knickerbocker History of New York– a spoof on the imagined colony of New Netherland.

The race was originally run as the Knickerbocker Handicap at Aqueduct Racetrack in late October or early November, although the 1962, 1995 and 2001 renewals were held at Belmont. The race was permanently moved to Belmont Park in 2008 and was changed from a handicap to allowance weight conditions in 2009.

The race has been run at a variety of distances over the years:
  miles – 1960, 1961, 1971 to 1974
  miles – 1962, 1975, 1976, 1978 to 1986
  miles – 1963 to 1969
  miles – 1970
  miles – 1977, 1995 and 2001
  miles – 1987 to 1994, 1996 to 2000, 2002 to present

The Knickerbocker was run in two divisions in 1963, 1967, 1969, 1976, 1977, 1980, 1981, 1982, 1983, and 1985.

In 1977, 1992 and 1997, the race was switched from turf to dirt due to rain.

Records
Speed record: (at current distance of 1 1/8 miles on turf)
 Za Approval, 1:46.51 ( 2013)

Most wins:
 2 – Shady Character (1974, 1975)
 2 - Charge d'Affaires (1999, 2000)
 2 – Boisterous (2011, 2012)

Most wins by a jockey:
 7 – Jean Cruguet (1977 (2), 1978, 1985, 1986, 1988, 1992)

Most wins by a trainer:
 6 – Christophe Clement (1993, 1999, 2000, 2009, 2013, 2017)

Most wins by an owner:
 5 – Ogden Mills Phipps / Phipps Stable (1974, 1975, 1978, 2011, 2012)

Winners

References

Horse races in the United States
Grade 3 stakes races in the United States
Graded stakes races in the United States
Open mile category horse races
Turf races in the United States
Belmont Park